The Banneker-Douglass Museum, formerly known as Mt. Moriah African Methodist Episcopal Church, is a historic church at Annapolis, Anne Arundel County, Maryland.  It was constructed in 1875 and remodeled in 1896.  It is a -story, gable-front brick church executed in the Gothic Revival style.  It served as the meeting hall for the First African Methodist Episcopal Church, originally formed in the 1790s, for nearly 100 years.  It was leased to the Maryland Commission on African-American History and Culture, becoming the state's official museum for African-American history and culture.  In 1984, a -story addition was added when the building opened as the Banneker-Douglass Museum.

It was listed on the National Register of Historic Places in 1973 and is within the boundaries of the Colonial Annapolis Historic District. Steven Newsome is the former director of the museum.

The Banneker-Douglass Museum is a museum dedicated to preserving Maryland's African American heritage.  Located at 84 Franklin Street, Annapolis, Maryland, the museum is housed in the old Mount Moriah A.M.E. Church.  The museum is named for Benjamin Banneker and Frederick Douglass.

The contributions of famous African American Maryland residents are highlighted, including Kunta Kinte, Benjamin Banneker, James Pennington, Frederick Douglass, Harriet Tubman, Matthew Henson and Thurgood Marshall.  Other exhibits include black life in Maryland, and African and African American art.  Lectures, workshops, performances and educational programs are offered each year.

The facility serves as the state's official repository of African American material culture.  The museum also has a library and archives.

See also
List of museums focused on African Americans

References

External links
, including photo from 2000, at Maryland Historical Trust
Banneker-Douglass Museum website

African-American museums in Maryland
Museums in Annapolis, Maryland
Biographical museums in Maryland
African Methodist Episcopal churches in Maryland
Churches on the National Register of Historic Places in Maryland
Churches in Anne Arundel County, Maryland
Churches completed in 1875
19th-century Methodist church buildings in the United States
African-American history in Annapolis, Maryland
National Register of Historic Places in Annapolis, Maryland
Benjamin Banneker
Frederick Douglass